3X or 3-X may refer to:

Three times or thrice
3X Krazy, American hip-hop group
Yeah 3x, single by Chris Brown
Windows 3.x
ArcView 3.x
Windows NT 3.x
IBM System/3X
3X, IATA code for Japan Air Commuter
3X or XXX, a reference to the municipal flag of Amsterdam*
HTV-3X, see DARPA Falcon Project
Look 3X; see Look Look Look
Alberta Highway 3X; see List of Alberta provincial highways
Saab 9-3X, a model of Saab 9-3
SEV-3X, a model of Seversky SEV-3

See also
X3 (disambiguation)
XXX (disambiguation)